Lam Tin is a station on the Hong Kong MTR  built as a part of the extension to . The station is linked to the nearby hillside community of Lam Tin by a series of escalators.

History 

In the 1980s, the Eastern Harbour Crossing (EHC or EHT) was planned by the colonial government.

It was later decided that before the entrance to the tunnel, trains would stop at a station in the Lam Tin Valley, where it goes into the Sai Tso Wan Hill and then underground to the entrance of the tunnel.

The station was opened on 1 October 1989. As part of his official visit to Hong Kong with Princess Diana, the Prince of Wales Charles (now Charles III) officiated the opening of the station, in which a commemorative plaque remains on display to this day.

After the opening of the EHC, Lam Tin, with the MTR station and bus terminals, became a crucial transport interchange in east Kowloon.

Platform screen doors have been in use since late August 2005.

Station layout 

Platforms 1 and 2 share the same island platform. Like Lai King station, Lam Tin station is built on an elevated platform, in which half of the platform is immersed into the Lam Tin Hill and so the station is sealed like other underground stations (but it is mixed as an elevated, ground level, and underground station).

The concourse is the first floor down the escalators from the hillside exits. It is divided into two parts: the paid area and the non-paid area. The paid area has escalators down to the platforms and has a postbox, while the non-paid area links the exits and houses a Hang Seng Bank branch.

Between the paid and non-paid areas there are the entrance gates and a customer service centre which serves both areas.

Entrances/exits 
A: Kai Tin Estate
B: Public Transport Interchange, Sceneway Plaza
C: Lei Yue Mun Road 
D1: Sin Fat Road
D2: Sceneway Garden

The station offers, on a trial basis, an accessible car service for passengers using wheelchairs. On demand, the service will transport the passengers from either exit A or D1 to exit C, which is accessible.

Transport connections 

Following the MTR station's opening in 1989, the area around Lam Tin station has been developed into a major transportation interchange in Hong Kong. The shopping centre and Sceneway Plaza above the transportation interchange adjacent to the station were built on a site that used to be occupied by a hillside squatter village.

The original Lam Tin community has also seen several rebuilding projects since the station had been built. The interchange has brought in new residential and commercial demand in the community. The bus termini, the Lei Yue Mun Interchange, and other public transportation facilities had transformed the Lam Tin area into an important transportation hub as well as a commercial and residential centre.

References 

MTR stations in Kowloon
Kwun Tong line
1989 establishments in Hong Kong
Railway stations in Hong Kong opened in 1989